Rustai-ye Shahid Salari (also Romanized as Rūstāī-ye Shahīd Sālārī) is a village in Jahadabad Rural District, in the Central District of Anbarabad County, Kerman Province, Iran. At the 2006 census, its population was 1,624, in 363 families.

References 

Populated places in Anbarabad County